Epithalassius is a genus of flies in the family Dolichopodidae, with eight known species. They are generally found in the Palaearctic, occurring on sand beaches near the coast. An exception to this is E. africus, which was described from a damaged female specimen collected near Brazzaville in the Republic of the Congo. The generic assignment of this African species has been doubted. E. corsicanus has also been recorded from Saint Helena in the Atlantic Ocean, and is probably an introduced species to the island.

Species
The following eight species are included in the genus:
Epithalassius africus Parent, 1930 – Congo (near Brazzaville)
Epithalassius caucasicus Becker, 1918 – Bulgaria, "Black Sea coast of the Caucasus"
Epithalassius corsicanus Becker, 1910 – France (Corsica), Israel, Saint Helena (introduced?)
Epithalassius elegantula Villeneuve, 1920 – France (Royan, Finistère)
Epithalassius gloagueni Grichanov, 2021 – France (Brittany)
Epithalassius sanctimarci Mik, 1891 – Corsica, Italy, Spain
Epithalassius stackelbergi Besovski, 1966 – Bulgaria, Romania
Epithalassius susmani Grichanov, 2008 – Israel

References 

Dolichopodidae genera
Hydrophorinae
Diptera of Europe
Diptera of Africa
Diptera of Asia
Taxa named by Josef Mik